Nickelodeon Ukraine (Ukrainian; Нікелодеон Україна) is a pop up channel in Pluto TV.

History
Nickelodeon started in Ukraine in October 1998 as a programming block on the Ukrainian television station QTV.

On November 5, 2003, a Ukrainian version of the channel was launched in Russian using the Pan-European feed.

In 1 September 2017, the Ukrainian-language Nickelodeon block was abolished due to QTV closing down the same month.

Return 
On 1 April 2022, Nickelodeon Ukraine returned as a pop up channel for Portugal, Poland and Germany on Pluto TV. 

Nickelodeon Ukraine launched a website on 12 April 2022 and has games, shows and events. The channel started adding more Nicktoons programming on 8 July 2022.

1998 establishments in Ukraine
2017 disestablishments in Ukraine
Defunct television stations in Ukraine
Nickelodeon
Television channels and stations established in 1998
Television channels and stations disestablished in 2017
Television channels and stations established in 2022